Bassett Furniture Industries is a furniture manufacturer and retailer, headquartered in Bassett, Virginia, United States. It was founded in 1902, by John D. Bassett, Charles C. Bassett, Samuel H. Bassett, and Reed L. Stone. Bassett Furniture is one of the oldest furniture manufacturers in Virginia. Bassett operates approximately 60 retail locations in the United States and Puerto Rico, and licenses its retail brand to about 40 additional locations.

References

External links

Furniture retailers of the United States
Manufacturing companies based in Virginia
Henry County, Virginia
American companies established in 1902
Manufacturing companies established in 1902
Retail companies established in 1902
1902 establishments in Virginia
Companies listed on the Nasdaq